Sarawittaya School (Thai : โรงเรียนสารวิทยา) is a secondary school in Bangkok, established in 1944.

History 
In 1941, during World War II many Bangkok schools shuttered. Many children of official (Thai:ข้าราชการ) and workers in Royal Thai Chemical Department could not find a school to attend. Officials and workers of the Royal Thai Chemical Department resolved that they should found a school.

In 1944, Col. Wittayasaronayuth founded the school using an office building as classrooms.

After the war, Col. Chukkrayutwichai Hongsakul contracted with the Ministry of Education to operate Sarawittaya School.

School Overview
 School Address : 2398/96 Phahonyothin Road, Chatuchak, Bangkok 10900
 School Abbreviation : S.R.V. (ส.ย)
 School Motto : "สุวิชโช ว ชเนสุโต" ผู้มีวิชาดี เป็นคนเด่นในหมู่ชน" or The study is featured in the nation. 
 School Colors : Green-White
 School Song : March Sarawittaya

Sarawitthaya School (TH: โรงเรียนสารวิทยา) (abbreviation: ส.ย.) is a large secondary school special Type of coeducation Located at 2398/96 Phaholyothin Road, Chatuchak 10900 Senanikom under Bangkok Educational Service Area Office Area 2, the Ministry of Education, the Journal was founded by Col. Chukkrayutwichai Hongsakul Director of Royal Thai Chemical Department. An area of 31 rai offered from level M 1- M 6 4200 students are teachers - teachers who are all 78 152 junior high school classrooms by the school has 14 rooms, 12 rooms for upper secondary school there. 5 lesson plan is. Science - Mathematics, Mathematics - English, English - foreign language 2, such as Chinese, Japanese, French.

Website  
Sarawittaya School

Landmarks in the area nearby 
 Kasetsart University
 Sripatum University
 Wat Bangbua

See also
List of schools in Thailand

Schools in Bangkok
Educational institutions established in 1944
1944 establishments in Thailand
Chatuchak district